Kenvelo is a clothing firm originally from the Czech Republic. It currently operates in approximately 270 stores in 18 countries: Czech Republic, Croatia, Slovakia, Romania, Israel, Bulgaria, Russia, Austria, United Kingdom, Lithuania, Belarus, Albania, Latvia, Estonia, Malta, Ukraine, Serbia and Germany.

History
Kenvelo dates back to December 1991, when Dany Himi and Michael Saul founded the Prague-based company, CTC - SPORTWEAR. Registered capital of the company was CSK 100 thousand. A few months later, Israel-born Himi became the sole owner of the company and gradually built a chain of clothing stores, Himi's Jeans.

In 1996, Himi decided to establish a new brand to compete with the well-established clothing chains. His initial proposal was Josh; other managers had different proposals. After each proposal, some managers said "yes" while others said "no". David Dahan proposed a brand name Kenvelo, Hebrew for "yesandno" (כן ולא).

In March 1998, Himi transferred a 30% share in CTC to David Dahan. In June 1999 CTC was renamed Kenvelo CZ.

References

External links

Official website

Clothing manufacturers
Clothing companies established in 1991
Manufacturing companies of the Czech Republic
Czech brands
Israeli brands
1991 establishments in Czechoslovakia